Diestostemma chinai is a species of sharpshooter in the genus Diestostemma.

References

Proconiini
Insects described in 1968